IAG may refer to:

Airport code
 Niagara Falls International Airport

Companies
 Individualized Apparel Group, American clothing holding company
 Industrial Alliance Group, Canadian Insurance Company
 Insurance Australia Group, an insurance company in Australia
 International Airlines Group, holding company of Aer Lingus, British Airways, Iberia, Level and Vueling
 International Audio Group, a manufacturer of hi-fi equipment

Other
 IAg, Immersion Silver plating, a conductor plating technology used for printed circuit boards
 I Am Ghost, a post-hardcore band from Long Beach, California
 Idiopathic adolescent gynecomastia, a medical condition
 International Association of Geodesy, part of the International Union of Geodesy and Geophysics
 Iraq Assistance Group, a former U.S. military command
 Louvain School of Management, formerly  of the University of Louvain (UCLouvain)
 Microsoft Intelligent Application Gateway, a combined hardware and software computer product by Microsoft